Yarmush is a surname. Notable people with the surname include:

Martin Yarmush (born 1952), American scientist, physician, and engineer
Michael Yarmush (born 1982), American-Canadian actor

See also
 Armush